QuinStreet, Inc. is a publicly traded marketing company based in Foster City, California. QuinStreet offers performance-based marketing and search engine marketing services. QuinStreet was founded in 1999, and has launched or acquired dozens of websites and other media properties.

The company was investigated in 2012 by 20 U.S. states for using deceptive marketing tactics to promote for-profit schools to U.S. veterans. QuinStreet agreed to pay $2.5 million and made several changes to its practices to end the investigation. Despite the sanctions, as late as 2016 QuinStreet continued gathering information which it sold to for-profit colleges.

History
QuinStreet was formed in 1999 by Doug Valenti (chairman and CEO). Bronwyn Syiek, another founding team member, was president and COO. The company was first profitable in 2002 with revenues of $13 million; by April 2009, QuinStreet reported $300 million in annual revenues and approximately 450 employees.

In February 2015, Nielsen NetRatings named QuinStreet the eighth top advertiser, after Education Dynamics, USA & StudentsLeads, India spending $9.4 million on 1.9 billion ads viewed.

QuinStreet Inc. acquired U.S. Citizens for Fair Credit  Card Terms, Inc, which operated the CardRatings.com website in August 2008 for an initial cash payment of $10.4 million.

In the beginning of August 2009, QuinStreet Inc. used some of its cash reserves to acquire the Internet.com division of WebMediaBrands Inc. for $18 million. Among the sites that QuinStreet Inc gained with the acquisition of Internet.com were InternetNews.com, Datamation.com, Webopedia.com, ServerWatch.com, EnterpriseNetworkingPlanet, SmallBusinessComputing.com, LinuxPlanet.com and Developer.com.

In September 2009, QuinStreet purchased Insure.com for $16 million. The company's other financial-services properties include MoneyRates.com, Get Rich Slowly, ConsumerismCommentary.com and HSH.com.

An initial public offering on February 11, 2010, raised $150 million, with the shares listed on Nasdaq under the symbol QNST.

In India, QuinStreet operates IndiaEducation.net, IndiaEduNews.net, and ExamResults.net, which it acquired in 2011 by incorporating QuinStreet India Marketing And Media Private Limited (QSIMM.)

In September 2011, QuinStreet acquired the IT Business Edge (ITBE) network of web publications

In February 2012, the company acquired the media assets of Ziff Davis "Enterprise", which included eWeek.com, CIOInsight.com, Baseline.com, ChannelInsider.com and WebBuyersGuide.com, and others.

In 2018, the company acquired AmOne, an online marketing company. In 2019, Quinstreet acquired CloudControlMedia, LLC and MyBankTracker.com, LLC.

For its second quarter of fiscal 2013, the Company reported total revenue of $71.8 million. Adjusted EBITDA was $11.2 million, or 16% of revenue.  For its fiscal 2016, QuinStreet reported total revenue of $297.7 million Quinstreet reported first quarter fiscal 2017 revenue of $73.4 million with an  EPS of $0.01, missing analyst targets. For its fiscal year ending June 30, 2018, QuinStreet reported net revenue of $404 million and basic net income per share of $0.34. Net revenue for fiscal year ending June 30, 2019, was reported to be $455 million with basic net income per share of $1.26.

In 2020, QuinStreet sold its B2B tech publications to TechnologyAdvice.

Partnerships
The company has partnerships with other organizations including Bob Vila and Credit.com.

Deceptive advertising investigation and settlement 
In June 2012, the company was under investigation by the Attorneys General's offices of 15 separate US states, led by the Attorney General of Kentucky, Jack Conway. The company was accused of targeting military veterans with deceptive recruiting practices for its for-profit school clients. The company agreed to pay a $2.5 million fine and relinquish the website GIBill.com. Quinstreet's education clients have included Art Institutes, DeVry University, Kaplan University, University of Phoenix, Westwood, and other for-profit colleges.

References

External links
 
 

Companies based in Foster City, California
Internet properties established in 1999
Marketing companies established in 1999
2010 initial public offerings
Companies listed on the Nasdaq
Online advertising services and affiliate networks
1999 establishments in California